Since 1988 the Australian Recording Industry Association (ARIA) has inducted artists into its annual ARIA Hall of Fame. While most have been recognised at the annual ARIA Music Awards, in 2005 ARIA sought to create a separate standalone ceremony ARIA Icons: Hall of Fame event as only one or two acts could be inducted under the old format due to time restrictions. Since 2005 VH1 obtained the rights to broadcast the show live on Foxtel, Austar and Optus networks; and each year five or six acts were inducted into the Hall of Fame with an additional act inducted at the following ARIA Music Awards.

At 1 July 2008 Hall of Fame ceremony, held at the Melbourne Town Hall, ARIA stated that the Hall of Fame ceremony would be completely separate from the ARIA Music Awards – there would be no additional inductees at the latter ceremony. ARIA had opened the Hall of Fame ceremony to the general public for the first time, and ARIA president Ed St John announced that a new annual exhibition, at the Arts Centre Melbourne from November, would showcase memorabilia honouring the Hall of Fame inductees. In 2011, the ceremony returned to the general ARIA Music Awards with two new inductees. In late 2017 ARIA partnered with Arts Centre Melbourne and the Australian music industry to establish the Australian Music Vault at Arts Centre Melbourne, which includes an honour board for all the inductees since 1988.

List of inductees

Notes

Repeat inductees
Eleven artists have been inducted into the ARIA Hall of Fame under more than one role:
 Glenn Shorrock as a solo artist in 1991, as a member of Little River Band in 2004.
 Harry Vanda and George Young of Vanda & Young as songwriters and producers in 1988, as members of The Easybeats in 2005.
 Jimmy Barnes as a member of Cold Chisel in 1993, as a solo artist in 2005.
 Ross Wilson as a solo artist and producer in 1989, as a member of Daddy Cool in 2006.
 Richard Grossman as a member of Divinyls in 2006, as a member of Hoodoo Gurus in 2007.
 Gary Young as a member of Daddy Cool in 2006, as a member of Jo Jo Zep & The Falcons in 2007.
 Neil Finn, Tim Finn and Paul Hester as members of both Split Enz in 2005 and Crowded House in 2016.
 Daryl Braithwaite as a member of Sherbet in 1990, as a solo artist in 2017.

See also

ARIA
ARIA Music Awards
VH1 Australia
 List of music museums
Hall of Fame inductees (alphabetical category)

References

External links
 ARIA Hall of Fame website
 Official ARIA Awards website
 ARIA site explaining ARIA Icons: Hall of Fame concept
 2008 ARIA Hall of Fame Inductees' biographies
 Learn more about the ARIA Hall of Fame inductees in Music Australia

1988 establishments in Australia
ARIA Music Awards
Halls of fame in Australia
ARIA

pt:ARIA Hall of Fame